Krzysztof Ropski (born 14 September 1996) is a Polish professional footballer who plays as a striker for III liga club Polonia Bytom. He has previously played professionally for clubs such as Radomiak Radom, Siarka Tarnobrzeg, Motor Lublin or Skra Częstochowa.

Club career
Ropski started his career in IV liga club Tuchovia Tuchów. He spent the next few years at youth level, playing for Unia Tarnów, and Cracovia. In August 2014, Ropski joined his hometown club Unia Tarnów at age 17. He made his debut for Unia on 13 August 2014, starting and playing 70 minutes in a 2–1 away win against Wierna Małogoszcz. In the 2014–15 season, he made 30 appearances for Unia, scoring six goals.

In July 2015, Ropski joined II liga club Radomiak Radom on loan, and he made his professional debut on 2 August 2015, during the opening game of the 2015–16 season in a 0–0 home draw against Znicz Pruszków He scored one goal for Radomiak in a 2–0 win at home against Błękitni Stargard Szczeciński.

On 16 July 2016, Ropski signed a two-year contract with II liga side Siarka Tarnobrzeg. On 23 October 2016, he scored on his debut for Siarka in a 2–2 draw against Gryf Wejherowo. On 23 November 2016, in the last game before the winter break, Ropski scored two late goals to give Siarka a 3–2 win over Puszcza Niepołomice. Ropski spent three-and-a-half years with Siarka, scoring 31 goals in 103 league games.

On 20 January 2020, Ropski signed a contract with Motor Lublin. On 30 December 2021, his contract was terminated by mutual consent.

References

External links
 

1996 births
Living people
Polish footballers
Association football forwards
MKS Cracovia (football) players
Unia Tarnów players
Siarka Tarnobrzeg players
Motor Lublin players
Skra Częstochowa players
Polonia Bytom players
I liga players
II liga players
III liga players